is a Japanese actress and voice actress from Tokyo, Japan.

Biography
As a child, Misaki appeared on stage shows such as Musical Wizard of Oz and Wandering. In 2003, she made her debut as a voice actress in the dubbing of the Korean film Phone. Misaki was active in dubbing foreign films early in her career, but since 2010, her appearance in anime and game works has increased. Her voice quality is described as like the "real voice of a young child" and a "voice with a unique presence".

Filmography

Anime
2010
 Oreimo (Bridget Evans)

2012
 Black Rock Shooter (Hiro Kuroi)

2013
 Day Break Illusion (Cerebrum)
 Galilei Donna (Grande Rosso)
 Log Horizon (Serara)
 Oreimo 2 (Bridget Evans)
 Problem Children Are Coming from Another World, Aren't They? (Melln)
 Ro-Kyu-Bu! SS (Mimi Balguerie)

2014
 Atelier Escha & Logy: Alchemists of the Dusk Sky (Coo)
 If Her Flag Breaks (Kurumiko Daishikyougawa)
 Log Horizon 2 (Serara)
 Mysterious Joker (Roko)
 Nanana's Buried Treasure (Saki Yoshino)
 Noragami (Keiichi Ono, Hinaha)
 Selector Infected WIXOSS (Tama)
 Strike the Blood (Lydianne Didieh)
 The Irregular at Magic High School (Nanami Kasuga)
 The Seven Deadly Sins (Hawk)
 World Conquest Zvezda Plot (Kate Hoshimiya/Lady Venera)

2015
 Durarara!!x2 (Akane Awakusu)
 Lupin the Third Part IV (Carla Gautieri)
 Mysterious Joker 2nd Season (Roko)
 Noragami Aragoto (Hinaha)
 Plastic Memories (Nina)
 Robot Girls Z+ (Pon-chan)
 Senki Zesshō Symphogear GX (Elfnein)
 The Idolmaster Cinderella Girls 2nd Season (Nina Ichihara)
 Utawarerumono: The False Faces (Shinonon)

2016
 Ace Attorney (Harumi Ayasato)
 Big Order (Sena Hoshimiya)
 Dimension W (Debbie Eastriver)
 Kamiwaza Wanda (Yui)
 Kiznaiver (Nico Niyama)
 Magi: Adventure of Sinbad (Kikiriku)
 March Comes in Like a Lion (Momo Kawamoto, Shiro-chan)
 Myriad Colors Phantom World (Kurumi Kumamakura)
 Mysterious Joker 3rd Season (Roko)
 Rilu Rilu Fairilu (Powawa)

2017    
 Akiba's Trip: The Animation (Tasujin Ratu)
 Battle Girl High School (Sakura Fujimiya)                   
 Chō Shōnen Tantei-dan NEO (Noro-chan)
 March Comes in Like a Lion 2nd Season (Momo Kawamoto, Shiro-chan)
 Monster Hunter Stories: Ride On (Nuts)
 Sagrada Reset (Mari Kurakawa)
 Senki Zesshō Symphogear AXZ (Elfnein)
 The Ancient Magus' Bride (Hugo)
 The Idolmaster Cinderella Girls Theater 2nd Season (Nina Ichihara)

2018    
 As Miss Beelzebub Likes (Belphegor)
 Dragon Pilot: Hisone and Masotan (Hisone Amakasu)
 Fairy Tail: Final Season (Abel)
 Happy Sugar Life (Shio Kōbe)
 Last Period (Dia)
 Lostorage conflated WIXOSS (Tama)
 The Seven Deadly Sins: Revival of the Commandments (Hawk)

2019
Azur Lane (Nagato, Ping Hai)
Carole & Tuesday (GGK)
 Endro! (Mao)
 Senki Zesshō Symphogear XV (Elfnein)
 Senryu Girl (Kino Yakobe)
 The Seven Deadly Sins: Wrath of the Gods (Hawk)

2020
Log Horizon: Destruction of the Round Table (Serara)
Mewkledreamy (Tsugi)
Re:Zero − Starting Life in Another World (Typhon)
Seton Academy: Join the Pack! (Yukari Komori)
The Misfit of Demon King Academy (Zeshia Kanon Ijaysica)

2021
 86 (Frederica Rosenfort)
 Godzilla Singular Point (Pero 2)
 Non Non Biyori Nonstop (Shiori)
 The Dungeon of Black Company (Rim)
 The Seven Deadly Sins: Dragon's Judgement (Hawk)

2022
 Aharen-san wa Hakarenai (Ren Aharen)
 Akebi's Sailor Uniform (Kao Akebi)
 Black Rock Shooter: Dawn Fall (Black Trike)
 Insect Land (Mia)
 Legend of Mana: The Teardrop Crystal (Miss Yuka)
 Lycoris Recoil (Kurumi)
 Made in Abyss: The Golden City of the Scorching Sun (Faputa)
 Prima Doll (Chiyo)
 Princess Connect! Re:Dive Season 2 (Misaki)
 Smile of the Arsnotoria the Animation (Arsnotoria)
 Summer Time Rendering (Haine)
 Utawarerumono: Mask of Truth (Shinonon)

2023
 The Fire Hunter (Touko)
 The Idolmaster Cinderella Girls U149 (Nina Ichihara)
 The Misfit of Demon King Academy II (Zeshia Kanon Ijaysica)
 Urusei Yatsura (Sugar)

OVA
2010
 Black Rock Shooter (Mato's younger brother)

2016
 Strike the Blood II (Didier Lydianne)

Films
 King of Thorn (2010) (Alice)
 Go! Princess PreCure The Movie: Go! Go!! Splendid Triple Feature!!! (2015) (Pan)
 Selector destructed WIXOSS (2016) (Tama)
Maquia: When the Promised Flower Blooms (2018) (Medmel)
 The Seven Deadly Sins the Movie: Prisoners of the Sky (2018) (Hawk)
 Sound! Euphonium The Movie - Our Promise: A Brand New Day (2019) (Satsuki Suzuki)
 The Seven Deadly Sins: Cursed by Light (2021) (Hawk)

Video games

2014
Granblue Fantasy (Camieux)

2015
The Great Ace Attorney: Adventures (Iris Wilson)
Kantai Collection (Littorio/Italia, Roma, Takanami)
Mighty No. 9 (Cryosphere)
 Battle Girl High School (Sakura Fujimiya)

2016
Shin Megami Tensei IV: Apocalypse (Toki)
Harmonia (Tipi)

2017
Xenoblade Chronicles 2 (Poppi (Japanese: ハナ, Hana))
 Azur Lane (ROC Ping-Hai (Japanese: 平海), IJN Nagato (Japanese: 長門))
Magia Record (Yuma Chitose)

2018
Princess Connect! Re:Dive (Misaki)

2019
Another Eden (Lovely)
Fate/Grand Order (Benienma)
The Seven Deadly Sins: Grand Cross (Hawk)

2020
Persona 5 Strikers (Sophia)
Fire Emblem Heroes (Mirabilis)
Genshin Impact (Klee)

2021
Smile of the Arsnotoria (Arsnotoria)
The King of Fighters All Star (Hawk)
Cookie Run: Kingdom (Custard Cookie III)

Dubbing

2003
 Finding Nemo (Darla)
 Aliens (Rebecca "Newt" Jorden)

2013
 Curse of Chucky (Alice Pierce)

2014
 Cold Comes the Night (Sophia (Ursula Parker))

2017
 Ouija: Origin of Evil (Doris Zander (Lulu Wilson))

2019
 A Series of Unfortunate Events (Sunny)
 A Dog's Journey (Toddler CJ)

2020
 Stillwater (Karl)
 Good Boys (Lily (Midori Francis))

2022
 Oni: Thunder God's Tale (Daruma-chan)

Discography

References

External links
 
Misaki Kuno at GamePlaza-Haruka Voice Acting Database 
Misaki Kuno at Hitoshi Doi's Seiyuu Database

1993 births
Living people
Japanese child actresses
Japanese musical theatre actresses
Japanese stage actresses
Japanese video game actresses
Japanese voice actresses
Voice actresses from Tokyo
20th-century Japanese actresses
21st-century Japanese actresses